Dunaújváros is a district in south-eastern part of Fejér County. Dunaújváros is also the name of the town where the district seat is found. The district is located in the Central Transdanubia Statistical Region.

Geography 
Dunaújváros District borders with Martonvásár District to the northeast, Ráckeve District (Pest County) and Kunszentmiklós District (Bács-Kiskun County) to the east, Paks District (Tolna County) to the south, Sárbogárd District, Székesfehérvár District and Gárdony District to the west. The number of the inhabited places in Dunaújváros District is 16.

Municipalities 
The district has 1 urban county, 3 towns, 3 large villages and 9 villages.
(ordered by population, as of 1 January 2012)

The bolded municipalities are cities, italics municipalities are large villages.

See also
List of cities and towns in Hungary

References

External links
 Postal codes of the Dunaújváros District

Districts in Fejér County